is a Japanese idol girl group was formed through a media mix project by Yasushi Akimoto, Aniplex, and Sony Music Records, which included the members performing as a musical group and an anime television series based on their characters. The members consist of voice actresses who provide the voice and motion capture for their characters.

History

2017: Debut
An audition for 8 characters, which included both a CD debut and an anime, was held until December 17, 2016, with the final examination taking place on December 24, 2016. On December 25, 2016, the idol group name was revealed as 22/7, which was chosen because it is an approximation to the mathematical constant , a transcendental number that represents their concept as "idols transcending through dimensions." Among 10,325 applicants, 11 voice actresses were chosen through voting, with only the first 8 characters announced. The group held their debut showcase on June 16, 2017, and an animated adaptation was announced during their first live event on July 22, 2017. 22/7's first single, "Boku wa Sonzai Shiteinakatta", was released on August 22, 2017, with the jacket designs illustrated by Yukiko Horiguchi. The music video was animated by Tatsunoko Production.

2018: 22/7 Keisanchū, final three characters revealed
On April 11, 2018, 22/7 released their second single, "Shampoo no Nioi ga Shita", with the CD visuals designed by Horiguchi again. A series of animated character shorts were also released. To promote the group's upcoming activities, 22/7 launched individual social media channels for the characters, including YouTube. 22/7's variety show, 22/7 Keisanchū, was broadcast on Tokyo MX beginning July 7, 2018.

22/7's third single, "Rikaisha", was released on August 22, 2018. The song was promoted during their annual live event on July 22, 2018, where they also announced Chiharu Hokaze had been elected the leader of the group. "Rikaisha" debuted at #7 on the Oricon Daily Singles Chart. On September 21, 2018, the last 3 characters for the remaining members of the group were revealed during a promotional event.

2019–present: Departure of Hanakawa, 22/7's anime adaptation
On July 22, 2019, the music video for their fourth single, "Nani mo Shite Agerarenai" was released, becoming the first of their releases to reveal all 11 characters. The single was released on August 21, 2019, with the disc debuting in 4th with 29,000 units sold in its first week on the Oricon Weekly Singles Chart. On December 11, 2019, Mei Hanakawa announced that she was leaving the group due to health issues. Hanakawa's final performance with the group was held on December 24, 2019, where Uta Kawase was introduced as a new member taking over the role of Nicole Saitō.

In February 2020, Takatsuji and Kuraoka went on hiatus due to poor health; Takatsuji resumed activities with the group on May 15 while Kuraoka returned to the group in September 2020. On December 1, 2020, Takeda went on hiatus to focus on her studies. On December 23, 2020, Hokaze announced she was leaving the group to pursue voice acting full-time, her final release with the group being "Boku ga Motteru Mono nara", which was released on February 28, 2021. On March 22, 2021, it was announced Takeda would return on April 10, 2021.

The remaining eight members continued to perform activities. On September 29, 2021, Umino and Kuraoka announced they were leaving the group in November while Takeda announced she was leaving in December. Umino stated her reason for leaving is to pursue voice acting full-time; Kuraoka stated it was to find a career path suitable for her; and Takeda stated she wanted to pursue a career as a model and television personality. On November 2, 2021, it was announced that Takatsuji would be leaving the group following a series of unexplained absences from work. Following the departures of the five members, the project announced on December 27, 2021 that they were retiring the five characters played by them.

Characters

Current

A girl who develops inferior complex, Miu serves as the main protagonist of the anime series. She is a 16-year-old girl from Saitama Prefecture who is distinguishable from bangs that covered her eyes most of the time. Miu is designed by Yukiko Horiguchi.

Nicole is a 16-year-old girl designed by Kurehito Misaki.

Ayaka is an aggressive and militant 17-year-old girl who is designed by Koharu Sakura.

Nicknamed "Ranran", Sakura is the 16-year-old daughter of a good family. She has a sunny personality with a dark side. Originally, Sakura was not written as an English speaker, but after noticing Amaki had drawn in a large overseas fanbase, she was rewritten as an English speaker who had grown up overseas. She is designed by Kantoku.

Akane is a 16-year-old girl whose personality resembles that of an aloof robot. However, under this façade is a very hard-working and cheerful girl. She is designed by Tometa Ohara.

Mikami is a 16-year-old girl with slow pace who came from Kyoto and speaks in Kyoto dialect. She is designed by Kouhaku Kuroboshi. She was revealed as a character in September 2018.

Retired

Reika is a 17-year-old honor student who is part of student council. She is designed by Hirokazu Koyama. The character was retired on December 27, 2021.

Miyako is an energetic 17-year-old girl from Osaka who speaks Kansai dialect. She is designed by Mieko Hosoi. The character was retired on December 27, 2021.

Yuki is a 15-year-old tomboy designed by Akio Watanabe. She was revealed as a character in September 2018. The character was retired on December 27, 2021.

Jun is a 15-year-old high class girl who is designed by Masayoshi Tanaka. The character was retired on December 27, 2021.

Tsubomi is a 17-year-old girl designed by Mel Kishida. She was revealed as a character in September 2018. The character was retired on December 27, 2021.

Discography

Filmography

Television

References

External links
 
 

2017 establishments in Japan
Aniplex franchises
Japanese girl groups
Japanese idol groups
Animated musical groups
Musical groups established in 2017
Sony Music Entertainment Japan artists
Sony Music Entertainment Japan franchises
Yasushi Akimoto